Athous bicolor is a species of click beetles.

Description
Body is quite elongated, with a fine pale pubescence, long mid-brown antennae and evident longitudinal ridges and small pits on the elytra. In males the pronotum is much longer than wide, while in the females it is slightly longer than wide and slightly laterally rounded. The elytra are ochre/yellow with dark sutural band, while head and pronotum are dark brown. The hind angles of the pronotum are olive.

Distribution
This species is widespread in most of Europe, from Russia through South and Central Europe to the Iberian Peninsula.

Biology
Oviposition takes place from the late Spring to early Summer. The yellowish-brown larvae develop underground and feed on the roots of many grass species. Adults can be found from June to August. These beetles hibernate as imago.

Habitat
Athous bicolor lives in grasslands and in areas with low vegetation and herbaceous plants.

References

Beetles of Europe
Dendrometrinae
Beetles described in 1777